Jordann Perret (born 15 October 1994) is a French ice hockey player for HC Dynamo Pardubice and the French national team.

He participated at the 2017 IIHF World Championship.

References

External links

1994 births
Living people
French ice hockey forwards
Dragons de Rouen players
Brûleurs de Loups players
HC Dynamo Pardubice players
French expatriate ice hockey people
Sportspeople from Isère
Expatriate ice hockey players in the Czech Republic
Stadion Hradec Králové players
French expatriate sportspeople in the Czech Republic